Chrysothamnus depressus called long-flowered rabbitbrush, is a North American species of flowering plants in the tribe Astereae within the family Asteraceae. It is native to the southwestern United States, the States of California, Arizona, New Mexico, Nevada, Utah, and Colorado. It grows in dry canyons, rocky crevices and similar habitats in the Mohave Desert, the Colorado Plateau, etc.

Chrysothamnus depressus is a branching shrub up to 50 cm (20 inches) tall. It produces large, dense arrays of small yellow flower heads, each with disc florets but no ray florets.

References

Astereae
Flora of the Southwestern United States
Flora of the California desert regions
Flora of Colorado
Flora of New Mexico
Flora of the Colorado Plateau and Canyonlands region
Natural history of the Mojave Desert
Plants described in 1848
Taxa named by Thomas Nuttall
Flora without expected TNC conservation status